Dame Mary Anne Morrison  (born 17 May 1937) is a former lady-in-waiting to Elizabeth II, and was a Woman of the Bedchamber from 1960 until the Queen's death in 2022.

Biography
Morrison is the daughter of John Morrison, 1st Baron Margadale and Margaret, Lady Margadale (née Smith). Her father and brothers were active as politicians of the Conservative Party. She was educated at Heathfield School, Ascot and at schools abroad, before becoming a lady-in-waiting.

On 14 June 2013, it was announced that Morrison would be made a Dame Grand Cross of the Royal Victorian Order in the 2013 Birthday Honours, having previously been Dame Commander. She has been described as one of the queen's closest confidantes. She has chosen not to use the style of Dame, but exclusively The Honourable. She received the Queen Elizabeth II Version of the Royal Household Long and Faithful Service Medal in 1980 for 20 years of service to the Royal Family and has subsequently received 30, 40, 50 and 60 year service bars.

Following Elizabeth II's death, she along with the late Queen's other ladies-in-waiting were made "Ladies of the Household", responsible for helping with events at Buckingham Palace.

References 

1937 births
Living people
British ladies-in-waiting
People educated at Heathfield School, Ascot
Daughters of barons
Dames Grand Cross of the Royal Victorian Order
Mary